Chittaranjan Tripathy (born in 1971) is an actor, director, and music director who predominantly works in Hindi and Odia films. He also acted & directed several Bollywood and Ollywood movies, But he is best known for his role as 'Trivedi' in the Netflix series Sacred Games.

Early life and education 
Tripathy was born in Chandabali in Odisha. He completed his MA in Sociology at the University of Hyderabad and, in 1996, a Diploma in Acting at the National School of Drama in Delhi. He's the batchmate of famous Bollywood actor Nawazuddin Siddiqui. Then he studied directing at the Guildford School of Acting, London.

Career 

In 2007, Tripathy came to the Odia movie industry with his film Dhauli Express, for which he was producer, director, scriptwriter, music director, lyricist and playback singer. The film received three Odisha State Film Awards. He made another movie Mukhyamantri in 2009. Other than this he has made more than 50 plays, including the NSD Rep's premiere production of Taj Mahal Ka Tender (for which he directed as well as wrote lyrics and music). He has directed episodes of television soaps Dhund Legi Manjil Hume, Ye isk he, Jaani Pehchani Si Ajnabi, Mano Ya Na Mano, and Savdhan India. He has acted in Hindi movies Delhi 6, Fantom, Sandar, Talvar, and Tera mera tedha medha. Tripathy has composed over 500 songs for plays. His last success was playing the role of Trivedi in the popular Netflix web-series Sacred Games. He also played the negative character in the latest ALT Balaji and ZEE5 web-series M.O.M - Mission Over Mars (2019).

Honours and awards 
 2007 - Mohana Sundara Dev Goswami Award - Dhauli Express
 2007 - Odisha State Film Award for Best Music Director - Dhauli Express
 2007 - Odisha State Film Award for Best Singer - Dhauli Express
 2016 - Odisha State Film Award for Best Comedian - Love you Jessica

Filmography

Films

Television

References

External links 
 

1971 births
Living people
People from Bhadrak district
Indian male screenwriters
21st-century Indian film directors
21st-century Indian male actors
Indian lyricists
Odia film directors